Ignacio Mariscal (Oaxaca, Mexico July 5, 1829 – Mexico City April 17, 1910) was a Mexican liberal lawyer, politician, writer, and diplomat. He was named Secretary of Foreign Affairs in 1871–72, for the first time during the Benito Juárez administration. During the Porfirio Diaz's government, he held the office in 1880–83 and 1885–1910. In 1909, he was the President of Mexican Academy of the Language.

Biography

Mariscal was born in Oaxaca, Mexico on July 5, 1829; his father were deputy during the Mexican–American War. He studied law at the Oaxaca Institute of Arts and Sciences, where he obtained his bachelor's degree in 1849.

For his opposition to the pro Santa Anna's governor, Ignacio Martínez Pinillo, he moved to Mexico City in 1854. With the triumph of the liberals, Juarez invited him to take part of the Juan Álvarez administration. He was named advisor on the implementation of Ecclesiastical Confiscations Law.

For his law knowledge and experience, his was elected as deputy of the 1857 Constituent Congress of Mexico. This Congress drew up the Constitution of 1857. He was member of the Judicial Committee where he took part on the debates related to the military and ecclesiastical Fuero. With the beginning of the Reform War, he traveled with President Juarez to Veracruz.

Writings 
He wrote several books; among them:

 Exposición sobre el código de procedimientos penales (1880) México;
 Historia de las dificultades entre México y Guatemala. Proyectada Intervención de Estados Unidos. Algunos documentos oficiales (1882);
 Discursos de los Exmos. Señores L. Marroquín é I. Mariscal en la Academia Mexicana de la Lengua (1899) México: Imp. Francisco Díaz de León.
 Memoria que en cumplimiento del precepto constitucional presenta al duodécimo Congreso de la Unión, el C. Ignacio Mariscal rendido ante el Senado acerca del tratado de límites entre Yucatán y Belice (1893) México;
 El Cuervo, original de Edgar Allan Poe, traducción (1895);
 Concurso científico nacional (1897);
 Don Nicolás Bravo o la clemencia mexicana (1900);
 Juárez y el libro de Bulnes (1904);
 Episodios en la vida de Juárez (1906); 
 Poesías (1911) Madrid. Editor Balbino Dávalos.

References 

Liberalism in Mexico
Mexican Secretaries of Foreign Affairs
1829 births
1910 deaths
19th-century Mexican writers
19th-century male writers
Mexican diplomats
People from Oaxaca
20th-century Mexican writers
20th-century Mexican male writers